"Que Sera" is a song recorded by Australian dance-pop group Justice Crew. It was released digitally on 2 May 2014 and physically in Australia on 16 May 2014, as the fourth single from their debut studio album Live by the Words. It was brought forward a week from its original release date of 9 May 2014 due to a high-profile TV sync on the My Kitchen Rules final and a live performance of the track on Sunrise on 5 May 2014. The song was also played during the 2015 Cricket World Cup when Kane Williamson got out in the semi-final of New Zealand vs South Africa.

Background and release
The song was announced as Justice Crew's new single whilst on their national #HypeTour and was available for pre-order from 17 April 2014 along with a 30-second sample through YouTube. Exploring themes such as friendship, harmony, reflection and an appreciation of life, with the clear connection to the well known saying "what will be, will be", the song enables listeners to draw parallels with their own life experiences as well as further understand Justice Crew's journey thus far.

Reception
For the week commencing 12 May 2014, "Que Sera" debuted at number one on the ARIA Singles Chart. It remained atop the chart for nine consecutive weeks, previously making it the longest-running number-one single by an Australian act since the ARIA Charts began in 1988, until the record was broken in 2019 by Tones and I with her song "Dance Monkey", which spent 10 weeks at the top. The song was certified fives times platinum by the Australian Recording Industry Association for selling over 350,000 copies.

"Que Sera" received two nominations at the 2014 ARIA Music Awards for Song of the Year and Best Pop Release.

Music videos
The first music video for "Que Sera" was directed by Lawrence Lim and premiered on Justice Crew's Vevo account on 12 May 2014. The video features the group singing and dancing in front of different coloured backdrops. It received a nomination at the 2014 ARIA Music Awards of 2014 for Best Video. A second music video for the US market was filmed in Los Angeles  and premiered on 28 July 2014. Christine Sams of The Daily Telegraph noted that the video "starts with a helicopter and sweeping views of what appears to be Los Angeles, before the band members show off their smooth makeovers in sharp black suits and sunglasses — and then in matching cream, pastel blues and whites." Sams felt that the video was reminiscent of Backstreet Boys, Boyz II Men and New Kids on the Block.

Cover versions
On 5 October 2014, Australian country music boy band Brothers3 covered "Que Sera" during the ninth live show of the sixth season of The X Factor Australia. Brothers3's version was released on the iTunes Store the following day, and debuted at number 42 on the ARIA Singles Chart.

Australian children's music group The Wiggles has also performed the song as part of their live shows.

Track listing
Digital download
Que Sera
Que Sera (Australian Version)

CD single
Que Sera
Que Sera (Karaoke version)

Charts

Weekly charts

Year-end charts

Certifications

Release history

See also
List of number-one singles of 2014 (Australia)
List of Australian chart achievements and milestones

References

2014 songs
2014 singles
Justice Crew songs
Songs written by Danny Mercer
Number-one singles in Australia
Songs written by Nasri (musician)
Songs written by Adam Messinger
Sony Music Australia singles
Songs written by Sir Nolan
Song recordings produced by DNA Songs